Golden Jubilee House, or Jubilee House, is the presidential palace in Accra that serves as a residence and office to the President of Ghana. Jubilee House is built on the site of a building that was constructed and used for administrative purposes by the British Gold Coast Government. The previous seat of government of Ghana was Osu Castle. It was renamed Golden Jubilee House by President Nana Addo Dankwa Akufo-Addo on 29 March 2018. It has previously been known as The Flagstaff House.

History 

The Flagstaff House was reconstructed and inaugurated by the government of John Agyekum Kufour with the name Golden Jubilee House in November 2008 when construction was about 70%–80% completed. In January 2009, the incoming government of President John Atta Mills moved the office of the president back to Osu Castle and later changed the sign in front of the building back to its original name claiming that the previous government had not used a Legislative Instrument to effect the change as required by law. The Mills government was in turn criticized that the name Flagstaff House which was given to the building by the British Gold Coast government glorifies Ghana's Gold Coast past. The seat of government was moved back to Flagstaff House in January 2013 by John Dramani Mahama.

Construction cost
The original budget for the reconstruction of $30m was a grant from the Indian government. However, BBC journalist David Amanor reported the construction may have cost as much as $45–50m. Building of the palace was overseen by an Indian contractor who used Ghanaian sub-contractors.

Notable events
 On 24 February 1966, soldiers stormed Flagstaff house as part of a military coup ousting Ghana's First President Kwame Nkrumah in a coup supported by the CIA.
 In 2002, thousands of Liberian women led by Leymah Gbowee staged a silent protest outside the previous presidential palace in Accra and demanded a resolution to the country's civil war. Their actions brought about an agreement that achieved peace in Liberia after a 14-year civil war. The story is told in a 2008 documentary film called Pray the Devil Back to Hell
On 4 June 2017, President John Dramani Mahama took then President-elect Nana Akufo-Addo on a tour of the Jubilee house.
On 26 July 2017,  Mrs. Marie-Louise Coleiro Preca, president of Malta and her spouse, Edgar Preca visited the Jubilee House.
On 6 April 2018, Mr. George M. Weah, President of Liberia, visited the Jubilee house.
On 22 October 2018, Brigadier (Rtd.) Julius Madaa Bio, president of Sierra Leone visited the Jubilee House.
On 2 November 2018, Prince Charles and his wife, Camilla visited the Jubilee House.

Re-construction

The re-construction of the presidential palace and building by the government of John Agyekum Kufour, who belonged to the ruling New Patriotic Party (NPP), was criticized by the opposition party National Democratic Congress (NDC) during the 2008 elections. The NDC government when sworn into office on 7 January 2009 refused to utilize Flagstaff House, preferring Osu Castle as the seat of government. The house was temporarily used as offices for the Ministry of Foreign Affairs.

References

External links
Breaking news: Flagstaff House renamed Golden Jubilee House by Nana Addo, YouTube video

Government of Ghana
Presidential residences
Houses completed in 2008
Buildings and structures in Accra
Government buildings in Ghana
Official residences in Ghana
2008 establishments in Ghana